La Bassée is a commune in the Nord department in northern France.

Population

Heraldry

Personalities
La Bassée was the birthplace of the painter and draftsman Louis-Léopold Boilly (1761–1845).

Another native was Ignace François Broutin (c. 1690–1751), a colonial officer, surveyor, architect and engineer in Louisiana (New France).

René Féret French actor producer and director 1945-2015 https://www.imdb.com/name/nm0299677/?ref_=fn_al_nm_1

See also
Communes of the Nord department

References

Communes of Nord (French department)
French Flanders